Stade Abdoulaye Makoro Cissoko is a multi-use stadium in Kayes, Mali. It is currently used mostly for football matches. It serves as a home ground of AS Sigui. It also hosted some matches for the 2002 African Cup of Nations. The stadium holds 30,000 people and was opened in 2001.

Abdoulaye Nakoro Cissoko
Kayes
Sports venues completed in 2001
2001 establishments in Mali